The HPI Pro 4 is a 1/10 scale radio controlled touring car manufactured by Hobby Products International (HPI). It features a centre propshaft to transfer the power from the motor to the rear and the front ball differentials. The gearbox features a bevel-and-ring gear design, and is made of graphite-reinforced plastic. The car is extremely popular with racers all around the world, because of its ability to be tuned to different track conditions. The Pro 4 won the 2004 National Championship.

External links 
 Comprehensive description of the HPI Pro4
 HPI Pro 4 site
 HPI Pro4 Facebook fans page
Pro 4